Ghabel is a surname. It may refer to:

Ahmad Ghabel (1954–2012), Iranian Hojjatoleslam Shia Muslim cleric, theologian, seminary lecturer, researcher, and author.
Hadi Ghabel (born ?), Iranian Islamic cleric, activist, and political prisoner

See also
Kabil (disambiguation), related name
Qabil (disambiguation), related name